Vlasina Lake is a semi-artificial lake in Southeast Serbia. It was created in 1947–51 when the peat bog Vlasinsko blato (Vlasina mud) was closed off by a dam and submerged by the waters of incoming rivers, chiefly the Vlasina.

Location 

Along the west shore, the regional road R122 leads across the dam towards Crna Trava in the north.

Geography 

The plateau is surrounded by the mountains of Čemernik, Vardenik and Gramada. Geological and hydrological surveys showed that lake used to existed in this area in distant history.

Its eastern coastline is jagged, with two bays: larger Biljanina bara and smaller Murin zaliv separated by Taraija peninsula. The southern part of the lake, between Bratanov del peninsula and the mouth of Božićki kanal is shallower, with swampy coasts and peat.

Islands 

There are two permanent islands on the lake, along its eastern coast: Dugi Del and Stratorija. Both islands are covered with green areas and forests.

Along with those islands, one of the lake's most famous features are the floating islands. They didn't exist in the former peat bog and began appearing after 1948, when the lake was created. It is estimated that the peat chunks took 5,000 years to form. There are up to 30 floating islands at the time. Driven by the wind, they float from one shore of the lake to another, carrying the flora and fauna, and serving as shelter and a food source for fish. For that reason, they are an attractive target for fishermen, however it is forbidden to visit them or disturb them because of the unique animal and plant ecosystems, though walking on them is practically impossible since they don't have solid ground.

It is overgrown with dense vegetation, including birch trees. Carried by the water currents and strong winds, in 2016 "Moby-Dick" almost reached the shore near the "Vlasina" hotel, softly attaching itself to the bank and becoming a major tourist attraction. Previous such occurrence happened in the mid-1990s. During the extremely low water level, it was reported in August 2018 that the island was partially stranded on dry ground. Another major storm and strong wind, detached Moby-Dick on 15 August 2020, which after four years continued to float on the lake surface.

Water 

The temperature of the water reaches  in the summer months, making for refreshing swimming. The temperature also varies with location and depth. In the village of Topli Dol south of the lake, there is a water factory "Vlasinka", producing high-quality mineral water called "Vlasinska Rosa", a renowned brand in Serbia. It was purchased by The Coca-Cola Company in 2005.

There are some 70 natural water springs in the lake area. The best known kladenac (cold water spring), noted for its cold water and most visited by the tourists, is the Sveti Nikola (Saint Nicholas) spring.

Dams 

The dam is located in the northwestern part of the lake. It is an embankment dam, built of a concrete core with an earth-filled cover. First plans for the power plant were made in the Kingdom of Yugoslavia, during the Interbellum. Construction ran from 1946 to 1948, when the reservoir was first filled. Of these,  is usable for hydroelectric exploitation. A part of the hydroelectric system is the pump station "Lisina", which pumps in water from the nearby Lisina Lake, chiefly in summer months. Vlasina Lake is also fed by numerous streams, descending from the surrounding mountains. The water level varies, depending on the water influx and drainage of the dam. Two artificial canals enter the lake near the dam: Čemernički kanal from the west and Strvna from east.

The construction of the entire Vrla complex of 4 power plants was finished in 1958. The water from another artificial lake, Lisina, on the Božička Reka, is being partially rerouted into the lakes watershed. As the Božička Reka is the longer headstream of the Dragovištica, which in turn flows into the Struma in Bulgaria which empties into the Aegean Sea in Greece. As the lake, via its outflow Vlasina, belongs to the Black Sea drainage basin, this way the artificial bifurcation was created.

Biodiversity and protection 

Flora and fauna of the lake, and the entire surrounding Vlasina region, are rich, and include several endemic species. It features over 850 species of flora and over 180 species of vertebrates, including rare species of mammals, reptiles and amphibians.

Plants 

The lake's surroundings are a mixture of meadows and high-altitude forests, especially birch, beech, pine and juniper (the former two indigenous, and the latter chiefly introduced by afforestation of the western shore). The indigenous trees downy birch and yellow beech (characteristic for its ever-yellow leaf color) stand out among the species of trees.

Sundew is the only carnivorous plant in Serbia and is unique to the Vlasina region. It is estimated that over 300 herbal species in the region are medicinal.

Animals 

The lake is home to 16 species of fish. These include: Brown Trout, Ohrid trout, Rainbow trout, European perch, European eel,  Eurasian minnow, Mediterranean barbel, grass carp, common carp, crucian carp, Prussian carp, tench, roach, common chub, pumpkinseed and others. Ohrid trout was stocked and it successfully adapted to the environment, making it a popular for fishing.

Birds includes gray heron, mallard, tufted duck and cormorant. Mammalian species include wild boars, wolves, foxes, hares, roe deer and feral horses.

Protection 

2018 water level fluctuation  

In the summer of 2018, both the citizens and the tourists, so as the administration of the Surdulica municipality reported the record low water level in the lake. Municipality issued a statement saying that the sudden water discharge at the dam may destroy the part of the plant and animal life in the lake. Numerous boats and barges were stranded, such as the "Moby-Dick", the largest floating island on the lake. The Elektroprivreda Srbije (EPS), a state-owned electric utility power company admitted that they are forced to discharge larger amounts of water from the lake because of the repairs on one of the four Vrla hydro power plants, but that no harm will be done. The reconstructed power plant, Vrla I, was built in 1955 and it was stated that the renovation "was necessary" and that the works will be finished by October 2018.

In the shallower bays the water receded significantly and they have been described as "desolate". The EPS claimed that the works will last for only 30 days and that water level has to be reduced to  but continued to claim that no harm will be done. University of Belgrade Geography Faculty contradicted the company's claim. The longer floating island are stranded, the greater is the chance that they will not "unhinge" from the bank when the water rises. Head of the local protection enterprise accused EPS of lowering the water level to produce more electricity rather than to renovate the plant. The EPS stated that "in the period to come", they will start to pump the water from the Lisine Lake into the Vlasina.

Tourism 

Current tourist capacity includes around 300 beds in hotels "Vlasina" and "Narcis", offering a modest range of services. There is a youth resort, Omladinsko Naselje, at the lake, with over 200 beds. It has not been maintained for a while, though in 2019 and 2021 its full renovation was announced. Along with regular tourists, they often host sporting teams from Serbia and abroad, as the lake is a popular destination for summer training due to its high altitude. Sporting grounds include a large football field, small sports field and weightlifting room.

Touristic attractions could include the numerous churches from the 19th century in the area. Also, the region is known for many popular local legends, which include myths of the giant water beasts, fairies and the now submerged bridge which was allegedly built by the Crusaders on their way to Jerusalem.

An ambitious project for development of tourism is planned for the Vlasina area by the country's Development plan and the Ministry of Tourism, and it is included in the 2005 "21 projects for the 21st century" plan. The planned facilities include a new tourist center Novi Rid, with 1,000 beds and shopping center, tourist center Krstinci with 350 beds, center "Džukelice" for summer sports, a marina for sailboats (motorboats are forbidden on the lake), a number of ski lifts and facilities for Nordic skiing. By this plan, by 2021 Vlasina was to get a heliport and an airfield for smaller airplanes.

Nothing of this happened, and in 2022 another ambitious plan for the neglected tourism center was announced, which would include an investment of €500 million and 10,000 new jobs. Announced as the "eco-icon of Europe", the project was to follow the strictest ecological rules. More or less, the same attractions and structures were planned, as per the 2005 plan. Local ecological groups doubted such a massive and expensive project, especially at such high standards, will be done.

Gallery

See also 
List of lakes in Serbia

References

External links 

https://web.archive.org/web/20120227033831/http://www.netbre.info/vlasina/
Photo of the floating islands
A mushroom collector's image gallery 

Lakes of Serbia
Protected areas of Serbia